Jiří Novák and David Rikl were the defending champions but lost in the second round to Chris Haggard and Tom Vanhoudt.

Mark Knowles and Daniel Nestor won in the final 6–3, 3–6, 6–1 against Donald Johnson and Jared Palmer.

Seeds
All sixteen seeded teams received byes into the second round.

Draw

Finals

Top half

Section 1

Section 2

Bottom half

Section 3

Section 4

External links
 2002 NASDAQ-100 Open Men's Doubles Draw

Men's Doubles
2002 ATP Tour